The Correctional Reception Center is a state prison for men located in Orient, Pickaway County, Ohio, opened in 1987, owned and operated by the Ohio Department of Rehabilitation and Correction.

The facility holds a maximum of 1500 inmates at various security levels.  The prison is immediately adjacent to the state's Pickaway Correctional Institution.

Ariel Castro committed suicide while incarcerated at the facility in September 2013.

References

Prisons in Ohio
Buildings and structures in Pickaway County, Ohio
1987 establishments in Ohio